Trujillo Province may refer to:

 Trujillo Province, Peru

In the area of present-day Venezuela:
 Trujillo Province (Gran Colombia), from 1824 to 1830
 Trujillo Province (Venezuela), from 1831, as a split from Maracaibo

Province name disambiguation pages